Kato Rodini is a small coastal settlement in the municipal unit of Rio in the northern part of Achaea, Greece.  It is located 2 km north east of Psathopyrgos and 18 km north east of Patras. The Greek National Road 8A (Patras - Aigio - Corinth)  pass south of the village. In 1996 the settlement was attached to the neighboring village of Psathopyrgos. The sea and the beach of Rodini is similar to all the beaches of north Peloponnese, 3-5 meters wide with peebles and clean, fresh waters.

Gallery

See also
Psathopyrgos
List of settlements in Achaea

References

Populated places in Achaea
Rio, Greece